7th Signal Regiment may refer to:

 7th Signal Regiment (United Kingdom), former regiment of the Royal Corps of Signals, British Army
 7th Signal Regiment (Australia), current Australian Army signals intelligence unit
 7th Signal Regiment (Italy), current regiment of the Italian Army